Siciliaria grohmanniana is a species of air-breathing land snail, a terrestrial pulmonate gastropod mollusk in the family Clausiliidae, the door snails, all of which have a clausilium.

Siciliaria grohmanniana is the type species of the genus Siciliaria.

Distribution 
This species occurs in Sicily.

References

External links 

 http://www.animalbase.uni-goettingen.de/zooweb/servlet/AnimalBase/home/species?id=201

Clausiliidae
Gastropods described in 1836